Keith Van Horne (born November 6, 1957) is an American former professional football player who was an offensive tackle in the National Football League (NFL) for 13 seasons during the 1980s and 1990s. He played college football for the University of Southern California and earned All-American honors. Van Horne was selected in the first round of the 1981 NFL Draft, and played professionally for the NFL's Chicago Bears.

Early years
Van Horne was born in Mt. Lebanon, Pennsylvania. He attended Fullerton High School in Fullerton, California. His Fullerton football varsity teammates included future NFL New Orleans Saints tight end Hoby Brenner.

College career
He attended the University of Southern California, where he played for the USC Trojans football team from 1977 to 1980. He was part of the Trojans 1978 National Championship team. As a senior in 1980, Van Horne was recognized as a consensus first-team All-American.

Professional career
The Chicago Bears selected Van Horne in the first round (11th pick overall) of the 1981 NFL Draft, and he played for the Bears from  though . He was a member of the 1985 Chicago Bears team, winners of Super Bowl XX. In his 13 NFL seasons, he played in 186 games for the Bears, and started 169 of them.

Personal life
Van Horne was married to Eleanor Mondale from 1988 to 1989.  He lives in the Chicago suburb of Riverwoods.

References

External links
 
 
 KEITH VAN HORNE, Appellee, v. MATTHEW "MANCOW" MULLER (Irma Blanco et al., Appellants), State of Illinois, December 3, 1998

1957 births
Living people
American football offensive tackles
Chicago Bears players
USC Trojans football players
All-American college football players
Sportspeople from Fullerton, California
Sportspeople from Mt. Lebanon, Pennsylvania
Players of American football from California
Ed Block Courage Award recipients